Ozan Varol (born December 1, 1981) is an author and tenured law professor at Lewis & Clark Law School.

He is best known for coining the phrase "democratic coup" and authoring the book The Democratic Coup d'État.



Early life and career
Varol was born and raised in Istanbul, Turkey. He moved to the United States at the age of 17 for his undergraduate studies where he received a bachelor's degree in Planetary Sciences from Cornell University in 2003. During his time at Cornell, he served as a member of the operations team for NASA's 2003 Mars Exploration Rover project; which sent two rovers to examine the Martian surface. Varol later earned a Juris Doctor degree from the University of Iowa College of Law in 2007.

Varol currently teaches as an associate professor at the Lewis & Clark Law School in Portland, Oregon, focusing on the areas of constitutional law, criminal law, and comparative constitutional law. He is best known for his book The Democratic Coup d'État, published in 2017, which expands on his article of the same name, published in the Harvard International Law Journal in 2012. Both works explore the idea that a democracy can sometimes be established by a military coup. Foreign Policy'' magazine used Varol's criteria to analyze whether the 2013 Egyptian coup d'état that removed Mohammad Morsi from power was democratic. In addition, he has published over a dozen scholarly articles between the years of 2008 and 2017. He also writes weekly in his blog about critical thinking and non-conformity.

He has written about "constitutional stickiness" which Yaniv Roznai describes as follows: "even arbitrary or anachronistic existing constitutional provisions often stick during the remaking of constitutions, due to behavioral mechanisms and biases that entrench the constitutional status quo". Varol has also written about "temporary constitutional provisions" which remain in effect for a limited amount of time.

Varol has defined originalism broadly as the reliance on history for constitutional interpretation. This is limited not only to "legislating from the bench" but also to any interpretation of the constitution that may be informed by the views of historical figures.

Notable publications

References

External links 
 Ozanvarol.com

1981 births
Living people
Turkish legal scholars
Lewis & Clark College faculty
Cornell University alumni
Academics from Istanbul
University of Iowa College of Law alumni
Turkish emigrants to the United States